The Chokwe–Luchazi languages are a clade of Bantu languages coded Zone K.10 in Guthrie's classification. According to Nurse & Philippson (2003), they form a valid node. They are:
 Chokwe, Luvale, Luchazi, Mbunda, Nyengo, Luimbi

References